Addiction Canada launched in 2006 through the Vita Novus Treatment Organization as Canada's first privately held addiction treatment organization in having started with two locations.  Expansion in 2014 grew to two other locations in Alberta, Canada.

Media
The media regularly seeks experts from Addiction Canada for TV and radio spots, news reports and TV programs on CTV Toronto, Global, etalk Canada, CBC, 1010 talk radio, as well as on the television show on the CTS network and live call in show Living Clean.

Controversy
Addiction Canada has been the target of controversy throughout the years due to the nature of being privately held vs. government owned. This has seen them scrutinized for protocols and procedures because the private addiction treatment business is largely unregulated in Canada.

In May 2016 the CEO John Haines was charged with fraud over $5000 totalling $6.1 million, and one count each of money laundering, benefitting from the proceeds of crime, and trafficking in controlled substances.

There are also reports of staff not being paid dating back to 2015.

With employees alleging over $500K in unpaid wages, Addiction Canada CEO says centres will close.

References

Addiction organizations in Canada
Drug and alcohol rehabilitation centers